Ladykirk may refer to:

Ladykirk, Scottish Borders, a village
Lady Kirk, Orkney, a ruined church